Eliza Karley Hynes (born 29 January 1992) is an Australian volleyball and beach volleyball player, and an Australian rules footballer.

Volleyball career
Hynes played beach volleyball together with Taliqua Clancy from 2010 to 2012. They won the bronze medal at the 2010 FIVB Beach Volleyball U19 World Championships.

She was first selected to be part of the senior Australia women's national volleyball team for a tour of Vietnam in March, 2013. She then participated in the 2014 FIVB Volleyball World Grand Prix. At club level she played professionally for Orivesi's OrPo volleyball club in Finland's national women's league in 2013, and for Victoria Volleyball Academy in 2014.

AFL Women's career
On 21 May 2017, it was reported that Hynes had been signed by Collingwood as a rookie for the 2018 AFL Women's season. She had no prior experience playing Australian football, but hopes to play as a forward.

On 4 June 2018, Hynes was elevated to Collingwood's senior list ahead of the 2019 season.

In June 2020, Hynes retired from football.

Statistics
Statistics are correct to the end of the 2020 season.

|- style="background-color: #eaeaea"
! scope="row" style="text-align:center" | 2018
|style="text-align:center;"|
| 11 || 2 || 0 || 0 || 4 || 6 || 10 || 1 || 1 || 0.0 || 0.0 || 2.0 || 3.0 || 5.0 || 0.5 || 0.5
|- 
! scope="row" style="text-align:center" | 2019
|style="text-align:center;"|
| 11 || 6 || 0 || 0 || 8 || 18 || 26 || 6 || 16 || 0.0 || 0.0 || 1.3 || 3.0 || 4.3 || 1.0 || 2.7
|- style="background-color: #eaeaea"
! scope="row" style="text-align:center" | 2020
|style="text-align:center;"|
| 11 || 3 || 0 || 0 || 7 || 9 || 16 || 2 || 6 || 0.0 || 0.0 || 2.3 || 3.0 || 5.3 || 0.7 || 2.0
|- class="sortbottom"
! colspan=3| Career
! 11
! 0
! 0
! 19
! 25
! 52
! 9
! 23
! 0.0
! 0.0
! 1.7
! 3.0
! 4.7
! 0.8
! 2.1
|}

References

External links

1992 births
Living people
Australian women's volleyball players
Australian women's beach volleyball players
Place of birth missing (living people)
Australian rules footballers from Bendigo
Collingwood Football Club (AFLW) players
Wing spikers
21st-century Australian women
Sportswomen from Victoria (Australia)